Spennymoor was a county constituency centred on the town of Spennymoor in County Durham.  It returned one Member of Parliament (MP) to the House of Commons of the Parliament of the United Kingdom, elected by the first past the post system from 1918 to 1950.

History

Spennymoor was created under the Representation of the People Act 1918 for the 1918 general election, comprising southern parts of the abolished Mid Division of Durham, including the communities of Brandon, Brancepeth, Tudhoe and Willington. Spennymoor was added from Bishop Auckland and Crook and Tow Law from Barnard Castle.

It was abolished for the 1950 general election under the Representation of the People Act 1948, with the bulk of the constituency being included in the re-established constituency of North West Durham, with the exception of the town of Spennymoor itself, which was transferred to Durham.

Boundaries

 The Urban Districts of Brandon and Byshottles, Crook, Spennymoor, Tow Law, and Willington;
 in the Rural District of Auckland the parishes of Helmington Row, Hunwick and Helmington, and North Bedburn;
 the parish of Brancepeth in the Rural District of Durham; and
 the parish of Hedleyhope in the Rural District of Lanchester.

Members of Parliament

Election results

Elections in the 1910s 

Galbraith was sponsored by the Durham Miners' Association

Elections in the 1920s

Elections in the 1930s

Elections in the 1940s 
General Election 1939–40:

Another General Election was required to take place before the end of 1940. The political parties had been making preparations for an election to take place from 1939 and by the end of this year, the following candidates had been selected; 
Labour: Joseph Batey 
Conservative:

See also

 History of parliamentary constituencies and boundaries in Durham

References

Parliamentary constituencies in County Durham (historic)
Constituencies of the Parliament of the United Kingdom established in 1918
Constituencies of the Parliament of the United Kingdom disestablished in 1950
Spennymoor